Sparganothina aurozodion is a species of moth of the family Tortricidae. It is found in Peru.

The ground colour of the forewings is golden yellow with brown markings with dark brown edges. The hindwings are cream with weak yellow-brown strigulae (fine streaks) at the apex.

Etymology
The species name refers to the colouration of the species and is derived from Latin aureus (meaning golden) and Greek zodion (meaning a small animal).

References

Moths described in 2010
Sparganothini
Moths of South America
Taxa named by Józef Razowski